Mario Vaquerizo Caro (Madrid, 5 July 1974) is a Spanish singer-songwriter, journalist, writer, manager and occasional radio and television personality. He became famous with the Spanish reality show Alaska y Mario on MTV Spain. The reality show depicted his life with his wife, the singer Alaska, whom he married in Las Vegas. He is also known for his appearances on different Spanish radio and TV shows such as El Hormiguero, El programa de Ana Rosa, and yu: No te pierdas nada. Vaquerizo was also the voice of Frankenstein in the Spanish language version of the animated film Hotel Transylvania.

Professional career 
Vaquerizo has worked as a media contributor to Spanish newspapers El País and La Razón, magazines such as Vanidad, Primera Línea, Rolling Stone, In Touch, and Canal+, a French premium cable channel. In 1999, he began collaborating with the advertising department at the record company Subterfuge.

He also worked as press agent for Spanish musical groups Fangoria, Dover, singers Merche and Silvia Superstar, and actresses Elsa Pataki and Leonor Watling. In addition, under the stage name Nancy Anoréxica, he is the lead singer of the Spanish pop group Las Nancys Rubias, which specializes in band covers. Other members of the group are his sister Marta Vaquerizo, Juan Pedro del Moral, Susie Pop, and Miguel. They have released five albums with Warner Music Group, their most famous songs being "Peluquitas", "Me da igual", "Sálvame", "Corazón de hielo" and "Di que sí". In 2014, Vaquerizo published a book titled Fabiografía; written in the first person, it is the biography of Fabio McNamara, an important artist and figure in La Movida Madrileña counterculture scene.

Filmography

Television

References 

 Olvido (Alaska) es mi alma gemela y encima está muy buena

External links 
 Alaska y Mario, el blog de Alaska y Mario Vaquerizo

1974 births
Living people
People from Madrid
Musicians from Madrid
Spanish music journalists